Bugbears is the tenth studio album by English musician Darren Hayman featuring backing band the Short Parliament. It was released on 16 July 2013 by Fika Recordings. It is seen as a companion piece to Hayman's previous album The Violence (2012).

Critical reception

At Metacritic, which assigns a normalised rating out of 100 to reviews from mainstream critics, the album has an average score of 74 based on 6 reviews, indicating "universal acclaim".

Track listing

References

2013 albums
Darren Hayman albums